"Catch & Release" is a song by American singer-songwriter Matt Simons taken from his album of the same name. It was released in September 2014 and became a hit in the Netherlands, Spain, Portugal, France, Switzerland and Belgium.

Deepend remix
The song had much greater success when it was remixed by Dutch house DJ and producer duo Deepend (Bob van Ratingen and Falco van den Aker). This version released on 2 March 2015, was a hit in many European charts, making it to number 1 in Belgium (in both Flanders and Wallonia), Germany and France, as well as number 4 in Austria, and also charting in Switzerland.

Charts

Matt Simons original

Deepend Remix

Year-end charts

Certifications

References

2014 singles
2015 singles
2014 songs
SNEP Top Singles number-one singles
Number-one singles in Germany
Number-one singles in Spain
Ultratop 50 Singles (Flanders) number-one singles
Ultratop 50 Singles (Wallonia) number-one singles